The Dyrham Formation is a geologic formation in England. It preserves fossils dating back to the early part of the Jurassic period (Pliensbachian).

See also 
 List of fossiliferous stratigraphic units in England

References

 

Jurassic England
Pliensbachian Stage
Jurassic System of Europe